Ian Herman (born 11 October 1965) is a former Australian rules footballer who played with Carlton and Richmond in the Australian Football League (AFL).

Notes

External links

Ian Herman's profile at Blueseum

1965 births
Carlton Football Club players
Richmond Football Club players
Collegians Football Club players
Sandringham Football Club players
Living people
Australian rules footballers from Victoria (Australia)
People educated at Haileybury (Melbourne)